Maire O'Neill (born Mary Agnes Allgood; 11 January 1886 – 2 November 1952) was an Irish actress of stage and film. She holds a place in theatre history as the first actress to interpret the lead character of Pegeen Mike Flaherty in John Millington Synge's controversial masterpiece The Playboy of the Western World (1907).

Life
Born at 40 Middle Abbey Street, Dublin, O'Neill was one of eight children of compositor George and French polisher Margaret (née Harold) Allgood, she was known as "Molly". Her father was sternly Protestant and against all music, dancing and entertainment, and her mother a strict Catholic. After her father died in 1896, she was placed in an orphanage. She was apprenticed to a dressmaker. One of Allgood's brothers, Tom, became a Catholic priest.

Maud Gonne set up Inghinidhe na hÉireann (Daughters of Ireland) in 1900 to educate women about Irish history, language and the arts, and Allgood and her sister Sara joined the association's drama classes around 1903. Their acting teacher, Willie Fay, enrolled them in the National Theatre Society, later known as the Abbey Theatre. Maire was part of the Abbey Theatre from 1906 to 1918 where she appeared in many productions. In 1904, she was cast in a play by Irish playwright Teresa Deevy titled Katie Roche, where she played the part of Margaret Drybone; there were 38 performances in this production.

In 1905, Molly met Irish playwright John Millington Synge, and they fell in love, a relationship regarded as scandalous because it crossed the class barriers of the time. In September 1907, he had surgery for the removal of troublesome neck glands, but a later tumour was found to be inoperable. They became engaged before his death in March 1909. Synge wrote the plays The Playboy of the Western World and Deirdre of the Sorrows for Allgood.

She made her American debut in New York in 1914 in the play General John Regan at the Hudson Theatre. Under her professional name Maire O'Neill, she appeared in films from 1930 to 1953, including Alfred Hitchcock's film version of Seán O'Casey's play Juno and the Paycock (1930). 

She played a small part in Brian Desmond Hurst’s film of Riders to the Sea (1935) IMDb, which starred her sister Sara. Denis Johnston, who was also in the cast, relates in his biography of Synge a colourful incident during filming that involved Molly: she cunningly and simply managed to spoil the last shot of the week with a wardrobe malfunction so that the actors would get another week's filming - and pay - the next week.

Marriages
In June 1911, she married G. H. Mair, drama critic of the Manchester Guardian, and later assistant secretary of the British Department of Information, assistant director of the League of Nations Information Office in Geneva, and head of the League of Nations office in London, with whom she had two children. He died suddenly on 3 January 1926. Six months later, she married Arthur Sinclair, an Abbey actor. They had two children but divorced.

Her life suffered a full share of tragedies: her fiancé Synge died before they married; she was crushed by her brother Frank's death in World War I in 1915; her beloved husband Sinclair died after 15 years of marriage; and their son died in an air crash in 1942. Her sister Sara's husband and baby died of influenza during the Spanish flu. Sara died two years before her, and they had become estranged.

Death
She died in Park Prewett Hospital, Basingstoke, England on 2 November 1952, aged 66, where she was receiving treatment after being badly burned in a fire at her London home.

In fiction
Joseph O'Connor's 2010 novel Ghost Light loosely is based on Allgood's relationship with Synge.

Partial filmography

 Juno and the Paycock (1930) - Mrs. Maisie Madigan
 M'Blimey (1931)
 Something Always Happens (1934) - Tenement Mother (uncredited)
 Sing As We Go (1934) - Madame Osiris
 Irish Hearts (1934) - Mrs. Moriarty
 Peg of Old Drury (1935) - Mrs. Woffington - Peg's Mother
 Come Out of the Pantry (1935) - Mrs. Gore
 Riders to the Sea (1935, Short) - First Woman
 Fame (1936) - Mrs. Docker
 Ourselves Alone (1936) - Nanny
 Bulldog Drummond at Bay (1937) - Norah, the Housekeeper
 Glamorous Night (1937) - Phoebe
 Spring Handicap (1937) - Meg Clayton
 Farewell Again (1937) - Mrs. Brough
 Oh Boy! (1938) - Mrs. Baggs
 Penny Paradise (1938) - Widow Clegg
 St Martin's Lane (1938) - Mrs. Such
 My Irish Molly (1938) - Mrs. O'Shea
 Mountains O'Mourne (1938) - Maura Macree
 Sword of Honour (1939) - Biddy
 The Missing People (1939) - Housekeeper
 On the Night of the Fire (1939) - Neighbour
 The Arsenal Stadium Mystery (1939) - Housekeeper
 Dr. O'Dowd (1940) - Mrs. Mulvanry
 Convoy (1940) - Mary Hogan (uncredited)
 You Will Remember (1941) - Mrs. Barrett
 Love on the Dole (1941) - Mrs. Dorbell
 Penn of Pennsylvania (1942) - Cook
 Let the People Sing (1942) - Mrs. Mitterley
 Those Kids from Town (1942) - Housekeeper
 Theatre Royal (1943) - Mrs. Cope
 Great Day (1945) - Mrs. Bridget Walsh
 Murder in Reverse? (1945) - Mrs. Moore
 Gaiety George (1946) - Mrs. Murphy
 Piccadilly Incident (1946) - Mrs. Milligan
 Spring Song (1946) - Dresser
 Send for Paul Temple (1946) - Mrs. Neddy
 The Hills of Donegal (1947) - Hannah
 Saints and Sinners (1949) - Ma Murnaghan
 Someone at the Door (1950, uncredited)
 The Clouded Yellow (1950) - Nora
 Stranger at My Door (1950) - Clarissa Finnegan
 Scrooge (1951) - Alice's Patient
 Judgment Deferred (1952) - Mrs. O'Halloran
 Treasure Hunt (1952) - Bridgid
 The Oracle (1953) - Mrs. Lenham

Playography 
 Katie Roche (1994)

References

External links

Census records at Irish National Archives
Maire O'Neill at The Teresa Deevy Archive
Maire O'Neill at The Abbey Theatre Archive
 

1886 births
1952 deaths
Irish stage actresses
Irish film actresses
Actresses from Dublin (city)
20th-century Irish actresses